The Promise Land is an album by pianist Cedar Walton which was recorded in 2001 and released on the Highnote label.

Reception
Allmusic reviewed the album stating "Top-notch hard bop is performed by pianist Cedar Walton's quartet... Easily recommended for fans of modern straight-ahead jazz". All About Jazz observed "Walton's joyous musical spirit is candidly articulated on The Promise Land". JazzTimes said "everything seems to fall comfortably into place".

Track listing 
All compositions by Cedar Walton except where noted
 "Promise Land" - 5:14
 "N.P.S." - 6:44
 "Back to Bologna" - 5:19
 "Body and Soul" (Frank Eyton, Johnny Green, Edward Heyman, Robert Sour) - 8:56
 "Darn That Dream" (Eddie DeLange, Jimmy Van Heusen) - 5:33
 "Thirty Degrees to the Wind" - 7:30
 "Smoke Gets in Your Eyes" (Otto Harbach, Jerome Kern) - 6:26
 "I'll Know" (Frank Loesser) - 6:25
 "Bremond's Blues" - 5:28

Personnel 
Cedar Walton - piano
Vincent Herring - alto saxophone, flute
David Williams - bass
Kenny Washington - drums

Production
Don Sickler - producer
Rudy Van Gelder - engineer

References 

Cedar Walton albums
2001 albums
HighNote Records albums
Albums recorded at Van Gelder Studio